Tim Ellis may refer to:
Tim Ellis (bishop) (born 1953), Church of England bishop
Tim Ellis (lawyer) (born 1955), Australian barrister
Tim Ellis (magician) (born 1963), Australian magician
Tim Ellis (engineer), American aerospace engineer and the co-founder and CEO of Relativity Space